The Düsseldorf Panther are an American football team from Düsseldorf, Germany. The club is the oldest extant American football club in Europe, having been formed on 1 May 1978.

The Panthers are one of the most successful American football clubs in Germany, having won six German Bowls as well as becoming the first-ever German team to win the Eurobowl in 1995. Having won its 16th Junior Bowl in 2022, the club has the most successful youth department in the sport in Germany.

History 

The Panthers were formed on 1 May 1978 and, while not the first American football club in Germany—this honour going to the Frankfurter Löwen who were formed in 1977 but folded in the mid-1980s—are the oldest still existing club.

In 1979, the American Football Bundesliga, later to be renamed the German Football League, was formed, consisting of six clubs, the Düsseldorf Panther, Frankfurter Löwen, Ansbach Grizzlies, Munich Cowboys, Berlin Bears and Bremerhaven Seahawks. Of those six, the top two teams would contest the first ever German Bowl on 10 November 1979, however, the Panthers were a long shot from this game, finishing last without a win or point.

The team did not take part in the second or third season of the league, instead forming a rival league with a number of other clubs. The Panthers won this league, the Nordwestdeutsche Football-Liga, the NFL, in 1980 and 1981. Those two titles are however not recognised as national championships and the club, like all others in the league, soon returned to the Bundesliga.

From 1982 to 1986, the league stood under the dominance of the Panthers and the Ansbach Grizzlies, who played each other in four consecutive German Bowls, with the Panthers winning all but the 1985 one. The team remained a strong side after this but was only able to win one more championship, in 1988, in the following four years.

After a 1991 season when the club couldn't qualify for the play-offs, the Panthers returned to their former strength from 1992 onwards, the club experiencing a second golden era until 1996. Three German championships were won, in 1992, 1994 and 1995. In between, in 1993, the club only reached the semi finals while in 1996, it lost the final. Additionally, the Panthers became the first German side to win the Eurobowl in 1995. From 1995 onwards, the Panthers also had some local competition, with the Rhein Fire, based at Düsseldorf, playing in the NFL Europe until the league folded in 2007.

From the late 1990s, the club suffered from financial trouble and was unable to maintain its high standard. After three seasons of missing the play-offs altogether, the Panthers reached the semi finals once more in 2000 and the quarter finals the year after. The year 2001 however saw the club drop out of the league and, for financial reasons, restart in the tier-three Regionalliga West. Success quickly returned, the Panthers won their league and the 2nd Bundesliga in the following year, returning to the GFL by 2004.

Unlike in the past, the Panthers were not a play-off contender anymore, struggling against relegation instead. In 2004, a fifth place was still enough not to have to enter the relegation round, the following two years this was not the case. The team was unable to win a league match in 2005, but was saved in the relegation round when it defeated the Kiel Baltic Hurricanes there. The following season, its league performance was much improved but it could nevertheless only finish last, faced Kiel again in the relegation round and, this time lost.

The Panthers played four seasons at the second level after that, from 2007 to 2010, finishing in mid-table in the first three. In 2010, a second place entitled the club to play in the promotion round courtesy to the expansion of the GFL from 12 to 14 teams. The Panthers were then able to earn promotion to the GFL by narrowly overcoming the Berlin Rebels by a point on aggregate, winning 43–41 in Berlin and losing 33–34 at home.

The Panther's made a successful return to Germany's highest league in 2011, finishing third and qualifying for the play-offs where they met and defeated the Marburg Mercenaries in the quarter finals and advanced to the semi finals, where they lost to the Kiel Baltic Hurricanes. In 2012, the club came fourth in the northern division of the GFL and qualified for the play-off where it was knocked out by Schwäbisch Hall Unicorns in the quarter finals. In the 2013 season the club managed to finish only seventh in its division, thereby missing the play-offs. It came seventh again in 2014 and 2015, each time with only seven teams in the league, with only one win in two seasons. In 2016, they placed dead last once more, however this time the league had its full strength of eight teams, meaning a relegation round of Düsseldorf against the Cologne Crocodiles that had placed first in the GFL2 North. They lost relegation sending them down to the GFL2 for two years, before they again returned (overcoming the Hamburg Huskies in the Relegation round, but lost every single game in the 2019 German Football League including the relegation round against the Elmshorn Fighting Pirates. While Covid-19 led to the cancelation of the planned 2020 season, the 2021 season in the North saw the Hildesheim Invaders and the Elmshorn Fighting Pirates try to join the upstart European League of Football and ultimately withdraw their teams from the GFL after talks fell through with the ELF, thus leaving two open spots for the 2022 German Football League. Düsseldorf, having placed second in the 2021 GFL2 season behind the Berlin Adler would be eligible to fill one of those two spots if they so chose.

Honours
 Eurobowl
 Champions: 1995
 German Bowl
 Champions: 1983, 1984, 1986, 1992, 1994, 1995
 Runners-up: 1985, 1988, 1996
 EFL
 Participations: 1993, 1995, 1996, 2014
 GFL
 Northern Division champions: (9) 1983–1988, 1990, 1995, 1996
 Play-off qualification : (18) 1982–1990, 1992–1996, 2000, 2001, 2011–2012
 League membership : (30) 1979, 1982–2001, 2004–2006, 2011–2016, 2019
 GFL2:
 Northern Division champions: 2003, 2018
 Junior Bowl
 Champions: (15) 1982, 1985–1988, 1991, 1998, 2002–2008, 2010
 Runners-up: 1995, 2011, 2014, 2017, 2018

German Bowl appearances
The club's appearances in the German Bowl:

 Champions in bold.

Recent seasons
Recent seasons of the Panthers:

 PR = Promotion round
 RR = Relegation round
 QF = Quarter finals
 SF = Semi finals

References

External links
  Official website
  German Football League official website
  Football History Historic American football tables from Germany

American football teams in Germany
German Football League teams
American football teams established in 1978
Sport in Düsseldorf
1978 establishments in West Germany